Jovlon Ibrokhimov (born 10 December 1990) is an Uzbekistani professional footballer who currently plays as a midfielder for PFC Navbahor Namangan.

Career

Club
On 24 February 2011 FC Bunyodkors site presented and announced Jovlon Ibrokhimov as Bunyodkor's player for Season 2011.

On 18 February 2019, FC Bunyodkor announced that Ibrokhimov had joined Suwon.

International
Ibrokhimov has made appearances for the Uzbekistan national football team in the 2014 FIFA World Cup qualifying rounds.

References

External links 

1990 births
Living people
Uzbekistani footballers
Uzbekistan international footballers
FC Nasaf players
PFC Lokomotiv Tashkent players
FC Bunyodkor players
Suwon FC players
Place of birth missing (living people)
Association football midfielders
Uzbekistan Super League players
K League 2 players